Vadeli is a small village in Borsad taluka, Anand district, Gujarat, India. It is located around 8 km from Borsad. It is surrounded by the fertile Charotar region which largely produces tobacco, rice, cotton, lady finger, Tomato, Potato and other agricultural crops. PATEL owns the majority of business, majority of Patels are from 60 house community that dominates Amul Sahkari Madali Milk Dairy and Patel bazar. Other major communities are Darbar, Thakor, Brahmins and Christians. Gandhiji passed through Vadeli Patiya in Dandi March satyagrah, Borsad satyagraha.

Geography and climate

There are three main seasons: Summer, Monsoon and Winter. Aside from the monsoon season, the climate is dry. Cold northerly winds are responsible for a mild chill in January. The southwest monsoon brings a humid climate from mid-June to mid-September. The average rainfall is 93 cm (36.7 inches), but infrequent heavy torrential rains cause the river to flood.

Economy
The main economy of this village is agriculture. The main cash crop is tobacco, and tobacco processing is an important industry. The other crops with considerable area are bananas, rice, bajra and cotton to some extent.

Education
Vadeli have small Primary School up to 7 standard but nearest village of Bhadran has educational institutions for the development of children at every level.
There are both free and paid schools, with all types of facilities for education from kindergarten to graduation. These include boys' and girls' separate schools at the primary level, Tulsibhai Bakorbhai Amin High School, Science and Commerce College, Computer Centre, English Medium School from Nursery to H.S.C. classes, Gymnasium Centre and Jethabhai Narayanbhai Patels, and the Shambhuprasad Boarding House for students from out of town.

References

Villages in Anand district